The Waikare River is a river in the Bay of Plenty Region of New Zealand' North Island.

See also
List of rivers of New Zealand

References
 
 New Zealand 1:50000 Topographic Map Series sheet BF40 – Matahi
 New Zealand 1:50000 Topographic Map Series sheet BG40 – Waikaremoana

Rivers of the Bay of Plenty Region
Rivers of New Zealand